Vowell is a surname. Notable people with the surname include:

Arthur Wellesley Vowell (1841–1918), Irish-born civil servant and political figure in British Columbia
Jack Vowell (1927–2006), American politician, businessman, and academic
Peter Vowell (died 1654), schoolteacher executed as a Catholic and Royalist conspirator
Robert Vowell, MP
Sarah Vowell (born 1969), American author, journalist, essayist and social commentator

See also
Glen Vowell, British Columbia, First Nation reserve community of the Gitxsan people in the Hazelton area of the Skeena Country of British Columbia, Canada
Vowel, category of letter

de:Vowell